John (I) de Mowbray, 2nd Baron Mowbray (4 September 1286 – 23 March 1322) was the son of Roger de Mowbray, 1st Baron Mowbray. Lord of the manors of Tanfield and Well, Yorkshire.

De Mowbray served in the Scottish wars of Edward I. The baron held such offices as sheriff of Yorkshire, governor of the city of York, a warden of the Scottish marches, and governor of Malton and Scarborough Castles.

He took part in the rebellion of Thomas, Earl of Lancaster. He was captured at the battle of Boroughbridge and subsequently hanged at York.

John de Mowbray married Aline de Braose, (b. 1291 d. ca 1331), daughter of William de Braose, 2nd Baron Braose and Lord of Gower. They had at least two sons:

John, (b. 29 November 1310, Yorkshire, England d.1361 who succeeded his father to the barony.
Alexander, (c. 1314 – c. 1391.)

John de Mowbray was buried at Greyfriar's in York. The church was destroyed under Henry VIII's rule, and its grounds are now covered by the city's train station.

References

Bibliography
 Burke, Sir Bernard. "Mowbray-Earls of Nottingham, Dukes of Norfolk, Earls-Marshal, Earls of Warren and Surrey." A Genealogical History of the Dormant, Abeyant, Forfeited, and Extinct Peerages, of the British Empire. London: Wm Clowes and Sons, Ltd, 1962. p. 387.
 

1286 births
1322 deaths
13th-century English people
14th-century English people
Barons Mowbray
People knighted at the Feast of the Swans
John